Central review may refer to:
 Central Review, the Chinese journal Chūōkōron
 Central review (medicine) of pathology specimens